Ekaterina Doseykina (born 30 March 1990) is a female middle-distance runner from Russia. She competed in the Women's 3000 metres steeplechase event at the 2015 World Championships in Athletics in Beijing, China.

See also
 Russia at the 2015 World Championships in Athletics

References

1990 births
Living people
Russian female middle-distance runners
Russian female steeplechase runners
Place of birth missing (living people)
World Athletics Championships athletes for Russia
21st-century Russian women